Mark Anthony Dalesandro (born May 14, 1968) is a former Major League Baseball (MLB) catcher and third baseman.  He is an alumnus of Chicago's St. Ignatius College Prep (1986) and the University of Illinois at Urbana-Champaign.

Career
Drafted by the California Angels in the 18th round of the 1990 MLB amateur draft out of Illinois, Dalesandro would make his Major League Baseball debut with the California Angels on June 6, 1994, and appear in his final game on August 10, 2001.

Dalesandro played for the California Angels (-), Toronto Blue Jays (-) and Chicago White Sox.

After his playing career, Dalesandro became President of Baseball/Softball Operations with Elite Sports Performance.

References

External links

1968 births
Living people
American expatriate baseball players in Canada
Baseball players from Chicago
California Angels players
Charlotte Knights players
Chicago White Sox players
Illinois Fighting Illini baseball players
Major League Baseball catchers
Major League Baseball third basemen
St. Ignatius College Prep alumni
Toronto Blue Jays players
Boise Hawks players
Indianapolis Indians players
Iowa Cubs players
Midland Angels players
Palm Springs Angels players
Quad Cities Angels players
Syracuse SkyChiefs players
Vancouver Canadians players